Dendrobium racemosum, commonly known as the erect pencil orchid, is a species of orchid endemic to tropical North Queensland. It is an epiphytic or lithophytic orchid with yellowish stems, cylindrical dark green leaves and flowering stems with between eight and fifteen cream-coloured to pale yellow flowers with a thread-like tip on the labellum. It grows on trees and rocks in exposed positions in highland areas and in the tops of rainforest trees at lower altitudes.

Description
Flowering occurs from September to October.

Taxonomy and naming
The erect pencil orchid was first formally described in 1936 by William Henry Nicholls who gave it the name Dendrobium beckleri var. racemosum and published the description in The North Queensland Naturalist. In 1964 Stephen Clemesha and Alick Dockrill raised the variety to species status. The specific epithet (racemosum) is a Latin word meaning "full of clusters".

Distribution and habitat

References 

racemosum
Endemic orchids of Australia
Orchids of Queensland
Plants described in 1936